Għarb is an administrative unit of Malta, located at the westernmost point of the island of Gozo, with a population of 1,539 people (as of March 2014).

History
Għarb started as a small hamlet which developed around the middle ages. The word Għarb is the Arabic word for West, so it should be no surprise that the village is the most westerly place on Gozo. One can see its ancient roots in the centre of the village where some houses have fine examples of decorated stone balconies. Għarb was created as a parish in 1679, a move which gave impetus for the building of a new, baroque parish church. Built between 1699 and 1729, it has an elegant façade which has been compared with Francesco Borromini's Church of Saint Agnes in Piazza Navona, Rome. The village square, so quintessentially Gozitan, has become the view on many a postcard. On the square is a folklore museum housing all sorts of memorabilia retelling the Islands' rural history. Għarb lies in some of Gozo's most scenic countryside, particularly at Dbieġi, the highest hill on the Island. Also at Dbieġi is a centre for Gozitan crafts. Within the limits of Għarb is the Chapel of San Dimitri. According to legend, the first chapel was built on the cliff side by a woman whose son was freed from captivity by St. Demetrius. Also nearby is the Basilica ta' Pinu, Malta's pre-eminent shrine to the Virgin Mary. It was on this spot in 1883, that a local woman heard the voice of the Virgin. The parish church is dedicated to the visitation of Saint Mary to her cousin Saint Elizabeth. The late Karmni Grima, Frenċ tal-Għarb and Sunta tal-Għarb are two of its most renowned villagers.

Zones in Għarb

Birbuba
Ħodba
Il-Wileġ
San Katald
Ta' Lamuta
Ta' Pinu
Ta' Santu Pietru
Il-Fgura
Taż-Żejt
il-wilga
Wied tal-Knisja
Wied il-Mielaħ
Ta' Ħries
Fuq il-blata
Tat-trux
Il-misrah

Twin towns – sister cities

Għarb is twinned with:
 Castrolibero, Italy
 Massafra, Italy
 Pace del Mela, Italy
 Tortona, Italy
 Torrent, Spain
 Cépet, France

References

External links

Għarb Local Council

 
Towns in Malta
Local councils of Malta
Gozo